Miklosa, Miklósa or Mikloša is a surname. Notable people with the surname include:

 Erika Miklósa (born 1971), Hungarian coloratura soprano

See also
 Miklós

Hungarian-language surnames